"Music for a While" is a da capo aria for voice (usually soprano or tenor), harpsichord and bass viol by the English Baroque composer Henry Purcell.

Based on a repeating ground bass pattern, it is the second of four movements from his incidental music (Z 583) to Oedipus, a version of Sophocles' play by John Dryden and Nathaniel Lee, published in 1679. It was composed for a revival of the work in 1692. The aria was published posthumously in Orpheus Britannicus, book 2, 1702.

Music
The voice is accompanied by an instrumental part featuring an ascending ground bass. Harmonies and suitable counterpoint would have been supplied by the musician playing continuo on the harpsichord or other keyboard. Interestingly, the principal ground bass phrase, played before the entrance of the voice, is three bars long instead of the far more usual four.

Text
Music for a while
Shall all your cares beguile.

Wond'ring how your pains were eas'd
And disdaining to be pleas'd
Till Alecto free the dead
From their eternal bands,
Till the snakes drop from her head,
And the whip from out her hands.

Music for a while
Shall all your cares beguile.

The text is part of a longer musical interlude in act 3, scene 1 of Oedipus.

Recordings
The song is identified with Alfred Deller, the first modern countertenor. He seems to have first recorded it in the 1940s. It also appeared in an extended play compilation in the 1950s.
During the coronavirus lockdown in 2020, The King's Singers invited Polish countertenor Jakub Józef Orliński to collaborate on a remote performance which subsequently received over a million views on Youtube

References

External links
 
 
 Music for a While from Oedipus. BBC. Extract from a performance by Alfred Deller (countertenor) and Walter Bergmann (harpsichord).
 "Dryden/Purcell – 'Music for a While'" by Scott Horton, Harper's Magazine, March 8, 2009
, Doerthe Maria Sandmann (soprano), Christoph Dominik Ostendorf (harpsichord)

Arias in English
Incidental music
Compositions by Henry Purcell
1692 compositions